The Northern Cape Department of Agriculture, Land Reform and Rural Development is the department of the Government of the Northern Cape, responsible for overseeing and supporting the Northern Cape's agricultural sector. The political head of this department is MEC Mase Manopole.

References

External links
Official website

Government of the Northern Cape
Agriculture in South Africa
Land management ministries
Rural development in Africa
Northern Cape